Albert Newton is the name of:

Albert Newton (footballer) (born 1894), English footballer
Bert Newton (born 1938), Australian media personality
Albert Newton (bowls), Australian lawn bowler